SS Edward D. White was a Liberty ship built in the United States during World War II. She was named after Edward Douglass White, the ninth Chief Justice of the United States and a United States senator from Louisiana.

Construction
Edward D. White was laid down on 22 June 1943, under a Maritime Commission (MARCOM) contract, MC hull 1499, by J.A. Jones Construction, Brunswick, Georgia, and launched on 30 September 1943.

History
She was allocated to A.H. Bull & Company, on 30 September 1943. On 17 December 1945, she was laid up in the National Defense Reserve Fleet in the James River Group, Lee Hall, Virginia. On 5 May 1953, she was withdrawn from the fleet to be loaded with grain under the "Grain Program 1953", she returned loaded with grain on 20 May 1953. She was again withdrawn from the fleet on 4 November 1957, to have the grain unloaded, she returned empty on 8 November 1957. On 27 October 1958, she was withdrawn from the fleet to be loaded with grain under the "Grain Program 1958", she returned loaded with grain on 10 November 1958. She was again withdrawn from the fleet on 8 September 1959, to have the grain unloaded, she returned empty on 12 September 1959. On 11 June 1970, she was sold to Union Mineral & Alloys Corporation, for $43,212, for scrapping, she was delivered on 30 July 1970.

References

Bibliography

 
 
 
 
 

 

Liberty ships
Ships built in Brunswick, Georgia
1943 ships
James River Reserve Fleet
Hudson River Reserve Fleet
Hudson River Reserve Fleet Grain Program